Almaville is an unincorporated community in Rutherford County, Tennessee, in the United States.

History
A post office called Almaville was established in 1879, and remained in operation until it was discontinued in 1905. According to tradition, the first postmaster selected the name to honor Alma, a young lady in the neighborhood.

References

Unincorporated communities in Rutherford County, Tennessee
Unincorporated communities in Tennessee